The Military ranks of Republic of the Congo are the military insignia used by the Armed Forces of the Republic of the Congo. Being a former colony of France, the Republic of the Congo shares a rank structure similar to that of France.

Commissioned officer ranks
The rank insignia of commissioned officers.

Other ranks
The rank insignia of non-commissioned officers and enlisted personnel.

References

External links
 

Republic of the Congo
Military of the Republic of the Congo